Parabathynellidae is a family of crustaceans belonging to the order Bathynellacea. These creatures are characterized by their slender bodies, reduced eyes, and elongated antennae. They are typically less than 1 mm in length, making them difficult to observe without the aid of a microscope. Parabathynellidae are found in freshwater habitats around the world, including streams, springs, caves, and aquifers.

Studies have shown that Parabathynellidae play an important role in freshwater ecosystems as they are key decomposers, consuming leaf litter and other organic matter that falls into the water. This consumption of organic matter contributes to the cycling of nutrients in the ecosystem, making Parabathynellidae an important link in the food chain.

Genera

Genera:
 Afrobathynella Schminke, 1976
 Allobathynella Morimoto & Miura, 1957
 Arisubathynella Park & Eun, 2012

References

Crustaceans